Kenneth David Barefoot (born October 11, 1945) is a former American football tight end in the National Football League for the Washington Redskins and the Detroit Lions.  He played college football at Virginia Tech  which earned a trip to the 1967 Liberty Bowl in Memphis, TN.  He was selected to play for the East in the 43rd East–West Shrine Bowl in San Francisco under Coach Ara Parseghian and for the South in the 19th Senior Bowl in Mobile, Alabama under Coach Hank Stram. He held the record for most touchdown receptions by a tight end at Virginia Tech for over 35 years. Barefoot was drafted by the Washington Redskins as their 4th pick in the fifth round of the 1968 NFL Draft where he was coached by Otto Graham and Vince Lombardi.  He was inducted into the Virginia Tech Sports Hall of Fame in 1999.

Family
Barefoot married Kathleen Smith in 1966 and lives in Virginia Beach, Virginia.  Both of his daughters (Jenifer Barefoot and Kati Barefoot Robins) graduated from Virginia Tech and his two sons (Jason Barefoot and Kenny Barefoot) played football at Virginia Tech under Coach Frank Beamer. 

1945 births
Living people
Sportspeople from Portsmouth, Virginia
American football tight ends
Virginia Tech Hokies football players
Washington Redskins players